Iurie Mîrza is a Moldovan football player who currently is playing for Gagauziya-Oguzsport.

References 
http://moldova.sports.md/iurie2mirza/stats/

1993 births
Living people
Moldovan footballers
Association football wingers
FC Tiraspol players